Brace Hill is a mountain located in the Catskill Mountains of New York east-southeast of Walton, New York. Money Point is located southeast of Brace Hill and Colchester Mountain is located northeast.

References

Mountains of Delaware County, New York
Mountains of New York (state)